Pecorino  is a white Italian wine grape variety that grows in the Marche, Abruzzo,  Tuscany, Umbria and Lazio regions of Italy. Ampelographers believe that the grape is likely native to Marche, where the soil destined for this cultivation increases every year. This grape variety is used to produce the DOCG (Denominazione di origine controllata e garantita) wines, like the Offida Pecorino DOCG, and the DOC (Denominazione di origine controllata) wines, like the Falerio dei Colli Ascolani, the Colli Maceratesi and the Falerio dei Colli Ascolani.

Today, more than 20 qualities of wine are derived from this grape.

History

Pecorino is a very old variety that, as believed by ampelographers, likely originated as a wild grapevine growing in the Sibillini Mountains that was eventually domesticated for wine production. Despite its name, there is no direct link between the Pecorino grape and Pecorino cheese. Ampelographers believe that the grape's name derives from the Italian word pecora, meaning sheep, because this grape grows in the mountains where the sheep used to graze.  According to local people, sheep in the Marche region would often eat the grapes while moving through the vineyards.

In the ancient times, Romans considered central Italy as very important for wine production, especially processed from this grape. This cultivation is widely documented from the second part of the 19th century. In the documental history, in the year 1526 anyone who damaged the vineyards of the Pecorino grape in the territory of Norcia had to pay 10 coins as fine, according to the government local laws called the Statuti di Norcia (Umbria region).

In 1876, the Ministry of Agriculture, Industry and Commerce published an exhaustive list of variety of the grapes growing on the Italian soil; the list identified the areas of Pesaro, Ancona, Macerata and Teramo as the specific areas where mostly Pecorino grape was being grown.

Viticulture

Pecorino is an early ripening variety that tends to naturally produce low yields even without severe winter pruning. The variety does not have many viticultural hazards with a strong resistance to downy and powdery mildew.

Wine regions
In the 1980s, Guido Cocci Grifoni was the first producer to begin widely using Pecorino in his Offida DOC wines and introduced the variety to nearby Ripatransone. Today it is still a permitted variety in the Marche DOC wines of Falerio dei Colli Ascolani, Colli Maceratesi and Offida.

In addition to be grown in Marche, plantings of Pecorino can also be found in the Chieti, Pescara and Teramo provinces of Abruzzo where it is used in the sparkling wines of Controguerra and in several Indicazione geografica tipica (IGT) wines of the region. Plantings can also be found in Liguria, Lazio, Tuscany and Umbria.

DOC regulations

In the commune of Macerata in the Marche, Pecorino can be included in the Maceratino-based white wines of the Colli Maceratesi DOC provided that it doesn't collectively exceed more than 30% of the blend along with Trebbiano, Verdicchio, Malvasia, Chardonnay, Sauvignon blanc, Grechetto and Incrocio Bruni 54. The wine can be made in a still, sparkling spumante or as passito dessert wine. Any Pecorino destined for DOC wines must be harvested at a yield no greater than 15 tonnes/hectare with the finished wine in all styles needing to attain a minimum alcohol level of at least 11%.

In Controguerra, up to 30% of Pecorino in combination with Verdicchio and Chardonnay can be used in the Trebbiano-based sparkling wines of the DOC. Grapes are limited to a harvest yield of no more than 14 tonnes/hectare with the finished wine needing a minimum alcohol level of 11%.

Within the Falerio dei Colli Ascolani DOC, up to 25% Pecorino can be used along with Pinot blanc, Passerina, Verdicchio and Malvasia (itself limited to no more than 7%) in the Trebbiano-based wines of the region. Grapes in this white-wine only Marche DOC are limited a maximum yield of 14 tonnes/ha with the a minimum alcohol level for the finished wine of at least 11.5%.

Offida DOCG
In Offida, Pecorino can be made as a varietal provided it makes up at least 85% of the blend with other local, non-aromatic grapes permitted to fill in the remainder. Here grapes are limited to a yield of 10 tonnes/ha with the finished wines have an alcohol level of at least 12%. However, unlike Passerina which is also grown in the DOCG, Pecorino is not currently permitted to be used in the DOC's Vin Santo style wine.

Synonyms and confusion with other grapes
Over the years Pecorino has been known under a variety of synonyms including: Arquitano, Biancuccia, Bifolchetto, Bifolco, Bifolvo, Dolcipappola, Dolcipappolo, Forcese, Forconese, Iuvino, Juvino, Lanzesa, Moscianello, Mosciolo, Mostarello, Norcino, Pecorella, Pecorello, Pecorello di Rogliano, Pecori, Pecorina, Pecorina Aquitanella, Pecorina Arquatanella, Pecorino Bianco, Pecorino de Arquata, Pecorino di Arquata, Pecorino di Osimo, Piscianello, Piscianino, Promotico, Sgranarella, Stricarella, Striccarella, Trebbiano Viccio, Uva Cani, Uva degli Osti, Uva Dell'occhio Piccola, Uva Delle Donne, Uva Delle Peccore, Uvarella, Uvina, Vecia, Verdicchio Bastardo Bianco, Vissanello and Vissanello bianco.

Pecorino is sometimes confused with the Calabrian wine grape Greco bianco due to the similarities in synonyms with Greco often being called Pecorello bianco.

References

External links
 Pecorino Doc - Pecorino Doc , from Picenos

White wine grape varieties
Wine grapes of Italy